Musa Sadr al-Din al-Sadr (4 June 1928 – disappeared 31 August 1978) was an Iranian-born Lebanese scholar and political leader who founded the Amal Movement.

Born in the Chaharmardan neighborhood of Qom, Iran, he underwent both seminary and secular studies in Iran. He belongs to the Sadr family from Jabal Amel in Lebanon, a branch of the Musawi family tracing to Musa Ibn Jaafar, the seventh Shia Imam and ultimately to the Islamic prophet Muhammad through his daughter Fatima. Therefore, Musa al-Sadr is often styled with the honorific title Sayyid. He left Qom for Najaf to study theology and returned to Iran after the 1958 Iraqi coup d'état.

Some years later, Sadr went to Tyre, Lebanon as the emissary of Ayatollahs Borujerdi and Hakim. Fouad Ajami called him a "towering figure in modern Shi'i political thought and praxis". He gave the Shia population of Lebanon "a sense of community". In Lebanon, he founded and revived many organizations including schools, charities, and the Amal Movement.

On 25 August 1978, Sadr and two companions cheikh Mohamad Yaacoub and Abaass Bader el dine departed for Libya to meet with government officials at the invitation of Muammar Gaddafi. The three were last seen on 31 August. They were never heard from again. Many theories exist around the circumstances of Sadr's disappearance, none of which have been proven. His whereabouts remain unknown to this day.

Early life and education

Family background

Musa al-Sadr came from a long line of clerics tracing their ancestry back to Jabal Amel.

His great-great-grandfather S. Salih b. Muhammad Sharafeddin, a high-ranking cleric, was born in Shhour, a village near Tyre, Lebanon. Following a frantic turn of events related to an anti-Ottoman uprising, he left for Najaf. Sharafeddin's son, Sadreddin, left Najaf for Isfahan, which was then the most important centre of religious learning in Iran. He returned to Najaf shortly before his death in 1847. The youngest of his five sons, Ismail (as-Sadr), was born in Isfahan, in Qajar-ruled Iran, and eventually became a leading mujtahid.

The second son of Ismail, also named Sadreddin, was born in Ottoman Iraq and also decided to settle permanently in Iran. He became Musa al-Sadr's father. While living in Iran, Sadreddin married a daughter of Ayatollah Hussein Tabatabaei Qomi, an Iranian religious leader. She would become Musa al-Sadr's mother.

Early life
Musa al-Sadr was born in the Cheharmardan neighborhood of Qom, Iran, on 4 June 1928.

He attended Hayat Elementary School in Qom where he attended seminary classes informally; he started his official seminary education in 1941. His teachers considered him a "quick learner and remarkably knowledgeable for his young age". After a while he started teaching other students "lower-level" courses. This coincided with the "liberalizing of Iranian politics", the political climate of his time was secular, so that most religious scholars "felt politically and socially marginalized".

To have some influence in the "national life" he concluded that he had to become familiar with "modern science and contemporary world". As a result, he started a "full secular education" alongside his seminary studies. He moved to Tehran, where he completed a degree in Islamic jurisprudence (fiqh) and political sciences from Tehran University and learned some English and French. He then returned to Qom to study theology and Islamic philosophy under Allamah Muhammad Husayn Tabatabai.

In Iraq
Following the death of his father in 1953, he left Qom for Najaf to study theology under Ayatollah Muhsin al-Hakim and Abul Qasim Khui. There he had teachers such as: Ayatollah Hakim, Shaykh Morteza al Yasin, Ayatollah Abulqasim Khu'i, Shaykh Hossein Hilli, Shaykh Sadra Badkubahi, and others, some of whom became Marja after Ayatollah Borujerdi's death. Musa al-Sadr became a mujtahid in Najaf. In 1955 he traveled to Lebanon where he met Abd al-Hossein Sharafeddin. He had met him previously in 1936 when his family had hosted Abd al-Husayn in Iran. The same year he left Iran and returned to Najaf and, in the autumn of 1956, he married the daughter of Ayatollah Azizollah Khalili.

Return to Iran
After the 1958 Iraqi coup d'état and the overthrow of the monarchy in Iraq, Sadr returned to Iran. There, he accepted the request of Ali Davani, who was sent by Ayatollah Shariatmadari, and became an editor of Darsha'i az maktab-e Islam, also known as Maktab-e Eslam, a journal published by the Hawza of Qom and endorsed by Ayatollah Broujerdi. He began contributing with the third issue, focusing on Islamic economics, "a novel subject at the time". His articles in this field were then published as a book. He soon became the journal's "de facto editor-in-chief". He left the journal in December 1959 along with some of its original founders.

Musa Sadr also took part in devising a new scheme for Hawza called the "Preliminary plan for reforming the Hawza", which was then withdrawn, in cooperation with Mohammad Beheshti. In 1959, Sadr founded a private high school which provided an alternative to the state educational system for "observant parents".

Departure to Lebanon

Musa al-Sadr declined Ayatollah Broujerdi's request to go to Italy as his representative and instead left Qom for Najaf. There Ayatollah Muhsin al-Hakim urged him to accept an invitation from their relative Sayed Jafar Sharafeddin to become the leading Shi'a figure in the Southern Lebanese port city of Tyre, succeeding Jafar's father Abdul Hussein Sharif Al Din, who had died in 1957.

He left Najaf for Tyre in late 1959, as the "emissary" of Ayatollah Broujerdi and Ayatollah Hakim. At the request of some clerics, he later made several trips to Iran delivering several lectures such as "Islam is a Religion of Life" and "The World is Ready to Accept the Call of Islam." The latter included presenting his experiences in Lebanon and emphasizing the need to work "towards the betterment of Muslims."

In 1967, Imam al-Sadr traveled to West Africa to get acquainted with the Lebanese community and inspect its affairs and worked to link them to their homeland. He also met with Ivorian President Félix Houphouët-Boigny and Senegalese President Léopold Sédar Senghor and provided symbolic assistance to orphans in Senegal. Senghor praised the Imam's gesture, pointing out that he is following his activities with great interest, which had a great influence in spreading the feeling of love and faith among the citizens.

Sadr, who became known as Imam Musa, quickly became one of the most prominent advocates for the Shia population of Lebanon, a group that was both economically and politically disadvantaged.

"[Sadr] worked tirelessly to improve the lot of his community – to give them a voice, to protect them from the ravages of war and inter communal strife," said Vali Nasr. Sadr impressed the Lebanese people "by providing practical assistance," regardless of their sect. He was seen as a moderate, demanding that the Maronite Christians relinquish some of their power, but pursuing ecumenism and peaceful relations between the groups.

In 1969, Imam Musa was appointed the first head of the Supreme Islamic Shia Council (SISC) in Lebanon, an entity meant to give the Shia more say in government.

For the next four years, Sadr engaged the leadership of Syrian ‘Alawīs in an attempt to unify their political power with that of the Twelver Shia. Although controversial, recognition of the ‘Alawī as Shi'a coreligionists came in July 1973 when he and the ‘Alawī religious leadership successfully appointed an ‘Alawī as an official mufti to the Twelver community.

He revived the Jami'at al-Birr wal-Ihsan charity, founded by S. Salih b. Muhammad Sharafeddin and gathered money for The Social Institute (al-Mu'assasa al-Ijtima'iyya), an orphanage in Tyre. In 1963, Sadr established a sewing school and nursery named The Girls' Home (Bayt al-Fatat). The same year, he established The Institute of Islamic Studies (Ma'had al-Dirasat al-Islamiyya). In 1964, Sadr started Burj al-Shimali Technical Institute, whose funding was provided by Shi'a benefactors, bank loans, and the Lebanese Ministry of Education. In 1974, he founded, with Hussein el-Husseini, the Movement of the Disinherited to press for better economic and social conditions for the Shia. They established a number of schools and medical clinics throughout southern Lebanon, many of which are still in operation today. Sadr attempted to prevent the descent into violence that eventually led to the Lebanese Civil War by beginning a fast in a mosque in Beirut. There he was visited by Lebanese from all factions – both Muslim and Christian. Yasser Arafat and Syrian Foreign Minister Abd al-Halim Khaddam, also visited him. Formation of a national unity cabinet resulted from the meeting and Sadr's attempt to establish peace was a temporary success.

During the war, he aligned himself with the Lebanese National Movement and Movement of the Disinherited and in cooperation with Mostafa Chamran developed an armed wing known as Afwāj al-Muqāwamat al-Lubnāniyyah, better known as Amal ( meaning "hope"), which assembled youth and educated generation of Husaynis and Mousawis families. Shia were the only major community without a militia group in the land of militias; Amal was created by Sadr to protect Shia rights and interests.

However, in 1976, he withdrew his support after the Syrian invasion against Palestinian and leftist militias. He also actively cooperated with Mostafa Chamran, Sadegh Ghotbzadeh, and other Iranian Islamist activists during the civil war. Sadr and Chamran had an important role in the Islamic Revolution of Iran. They were involved in protests against the Shah out of Iran. According to Amal deputy, Ali Kharis, "Musa Sadr and Chamran were the backbone of the Iranian revolution and how one can not speak of the Iranian revolution without mentioning these two people."

In addition, Sadr was instrumental in developing ties between Hafez Assad, then Syrian president, and the opponents of Mohammad Reza Pahlavi, Shah of Iran.

Personal life

Musa al-Sadr maintained strong family relations with political leaders in Iran, Lebanon and Iraq. He is related to noted Iranian individuals namely Sadeq Tabatabaei (his nephew), as well as Mohammad Khatami (his wife was a niece of Musa al-Sadr), and Ayatollah Khomeini's son Ahmad Khomeini (his wife was another of Musa al-Sadr's nieces). Sadr's son was married to Khomeini's granddaughter. His sister, Rabab al-Sadr, is a social activist who does charity work, and also a painter trained in Italy who earned a doctorate in philosophy, her paradigm being influenced by Søren Kierkegaard.'

Charisma 
Musa al-Sadr has been referred to by Fouad Ajami as a "towering figure in modern Shi'i political thought and praxis." According to him, even American diplomats effusively described Musa Sadr after meeting him. He supports his claim by referring to a cable sent home by George M. Godley, a U.S. ambassador to Lebanon: "He is without debate one of the most, if not the most, impressive individual I have met in Lebanon. . . . His charisma is obvious and his apparent sincerity is awe-inspiring". In Lebanon, he had garnered significant popularity "due to his good rapport with young people."

The Shia in particular have been noted to be a people of some vanity. In the Shia tradition, the Imams were not only morally infallible men (an Imam was said to be masum, not subject to error), but also physically perfect beings. A blind man or a lame man would not have been accepted as an Imam. Musa al Sadr, a handsome man of striking looks, was true to his people's fantasy of what a man of piety and distinction and high birth slated for bigger things should look like. He was, in addition, a dazzling speaker in a culture that exalted the spoken word and those who could express in classical Arabic what was on the minds of others.<ref>Fouad Ajami, The Vanished Imam: Musa al Sadr and the Shia of Lebanon, Cornell University Press (2012), p. 48</ref></blockquote>

and

Sayyid Musa winked at traditions with a daring uncommon to men of his clerical calling and background. He was a hit with women, who admired his looks and his elegance and were pleased that they did not have to scurry out of living rooms and meetings when he arrived, as they did with ulama of more conservative outlook. As befitting a man of the religious mantle, he refrained from shaking hands with women, and his aides and companions forewarned Christian women who were to meet him that they should not try to shake hands. But even this prohibition was violated now and them. A woman who admitted being drawn to him, being nearly hypnotized by him, once held out a hand to him, and he took it between his two hands, saying that he was not supposed to do so, and that he was doing what he shouldn't be doing, that he would not do it again.

Disappearance
On 25 August 1978, al-Sadr and two companions, Sheikh Muhammad Yaacoub and journalist Abbas Badreddine, departed for Libya to meet with government officials at the invitation of Muammar Gaddafi. The three were last seen on 31 August. They were never heard from again.

It is widely believed, at least by Lebanese Shia Muslims, that Gaddafi ordered al-Sadr's killing, but differing motivations exist. Libya has consistently denied responsibility, claiming that Sadr and his companions left Libya for Italy. However, supporters of the missing cleric pointed out that al-Sadr's baggage was found in a Tripoli hotel and there was no evidence of his arrival in Rome. Airlines could not confirm that al-Sadr had ever flown to Italy from Libya.

Al-Sadr's son claimed that he remains secretly in jail in Libya but did not provide proof. Lebanese Parliament Speaker Nabih Berri claimed that the Libyan regime, and particularly the Libyan leader, was responsible for the disappearance of Imam Musa al-Sadr, as London-based Asharq Al-Awsat, a Saudi-run pan-Arab daily, reported on 27 August 2006.

According to Iranian General Mansour Qadar, the head of Syrian security, Rifaat al-Assad, told the Iranian ambassador to Syria that Gaddafi planned to kill al-Sadr. On 27 August 2008, Gaddafi was indicted by the government of Lebanon for al-Sadr's disappearance. Following the fall of the Gaddafi regime, Lebanon and Iran appealed to the Libyan rebels to investigate the fate of Musa al-Sadr.

Political analyst Roula Talj has said that Gaddafi's son, Saif al-Islam Gaddafi, told her that al-Sadr and his aides, Mohammed Yaqoub and Abbas Badreddin, never left Libya. According to a representative of Libya's National Transitional Council in Cairo, Gaddafi murdered al-Sadr after discussions about Shia beliefs. Sadr accused him of being unaware of Islamic teachings and of the Islamic branches of Shia and Sunni. According to other sources, Gaddafi had al-Sadr and his companions murdered at the request of Palestinian leader Yasser Arafat. At the time, the Shias and the Palestinians were involved in armed clashes in Southern Lebanon. According to a former member of the Libyan intelligence, al-Sadr was beaten to death for daring to challenge Gaddafi at his house on matters of theology. In an interview with Al Aan TV, Ahmed Ramadan, an influential figure in the Gaddafi regime and an eyewitness to the meeting between al-Sadr and Gaddafi, claimed that the meeting lasted for two and a half hours and ended with Gaddafi saying "take him". Ramadan also named three officials who he believes were responsible for the death of al-Sadr.

On 2021, Muqtada al-Sadr, the cousin of Musa al-Sadr and leader of the Sadrist Movement in Iraq, announced that a committee has been formed to investigate the fate of Musa al-Sadr.

Legacy

Imam Musa al-Sadr is still regarded as an important political and spiritual leader by the Shia Lebanese community. His status only grew after his disappearance in August 1978, and today his legacy is revered by both Amal and Hezbollah followers. In the eyes of many, he became a martyr and a "vanished imam." A tribute to his continuing popularity is that it is popular in parts of Lebanon to mimic his Persian accent. The Amal Party remains an important Shia organization in Lebanon and looks to al-Sadr as its founder.

According to Professor Seyyed Hossein Nasr, 

Works
al-Sadr wrote a long introduction to Henry Corbin's History of Islamic Philosophy.

al-Sadr's paper Islam, Humanity and Human Values was published by Ahlul Bayt World Assembly.Unity of the Islamic Schools of Thought According to Imam Musa Sadr includes a biography and an English adaptation of one of his books, Imam Musa Sadr: surush-e wahdat, Majma’ Jahani-ye Taqrib-e Madhahib-e Islami, 2004.''

Institutions  
 Imam Moussa Al Sadr Center for Research & Studies - Beirut, Lebanon
 Sadr Foundation - Tyre, Lebanon
 Sadr Foundation - Dearborn, Michigan, United States
 Imam Mousa Sadr High School - Tehran, Iran

See also 

Lebanese people in Iran
List of people who disappeared
List of Shi'a Muslim scholars of Islam
Modern Islamic philosophy
Mohammad Baqir al-Sadr
Mohammad Sadeq al-Sadr

References

External links
Imam Moussa Al-Sadr Online News
Imam Moussa as-Sadr Website
Imam Sadr Foundation
Haghshenas, Seyyed Ali, "Social and political structure of Lebanon and its influence on appearance of Amal Movement," Iran, Tehran. 2009

1928 births
1970s missing person cases
Al-Moussawi family
Amal Movement politicians
Iranian emigrants to Lebanon
Iranian grand ayatollahs
Iranian people of Lebanese descent
Iranian Shia clerics
Lebanese grand ayatollahs
Lebanese Muslims
Lebanese people of Iranian descent
Lebanese Shia Muslims
Missing people
Missing person cases in Libya
People declared dead in absentia
People from South Lebanon
People from Qom
Twelvers
University of Tehran alumni
Year of death uncertain
Qom Seminary alumni